Pseudoparaclius is a genus of flies in the family Dolichopodidae. It was established by Igor Grichanov in 2006, for 14 species from Africa that were originally placed in Paracleius (now a synonym of Pelastoneurus). Two additional species were described in 2015 and 2020.

Species
Pseudoparaclius afer (Curran, 1936)
Pseudoparaclius atricornis (Parent, 1934)
Pseudoparaclius brincki (Vanschuytbroeck, 1960)
Pseudoparaclius caudatus (Parent, 1934)
Pseudoparaclius funditor (Curran, 1936)
Pseudoparaclius kabasha (Grichanov, 2004)
Pseudoparaclius manningi Grichanov, 2020
Pseudoparaclius maranguensis (Vanschuytbroeck, 1964)
Pseudoparaclius miritarsus (Grichanov, 2004)
Pseudoparaclius ngarukaensis (Vanschuytbroeck, 1964)
Pseudoparaclius obscoenus (Wiedemann, 1830)
Pseudoparaclius ogojaensis (Vanschuytbroeck, 1962)
Pseudoparaclius sanjensis (Grichanov, 2004)
Pseudoparaclius udzungwa Kaae, Grichanov & Pape, 2015
Pseudoparaclius upembaensis (Grichanov, 2004)
Pseudoparaclius zogualensis (Grichanov, 2004)

References

Dolichopodinae
Dolichopodidae genera
Diptera of Africa
2006